The 1969 World Modern Pentathlon Championships were held in Budapest, Hungary.

Medal summary

Men's events

Medal table

See also
 World Modern Pentathlon Championship

References

 Sport123

World Modern Pentathlon Championships, 1969
Modern pentathlon in Europe
World Modern Pentathlon Championships, 1969
International sports competitions hosted by Hungary
International sports competitions in Budapest